Mark Ovenden is a composer and musician of Australian Aboriginal descent. In 2001 he won a Deadly for excellence In Film or Theatrical Score for his composing the score for Yolngu Boy.

References

External links
Yolngu Boy bio

Australian film score composers
Male film score composers
Indigenous Australian musicians
Living people
Year of birth missing (living people)